The 1956 Allan Cup was the Canadian senior ice hockey championship for the 1955–56 senior "A" season.  The event was hosted by the Vernon Canadians and Vernon, Kelowna, and Kamloops, British Columbia.  The 1956 playoff marked the 48th time that the Allan Cup has been awarded.

Teams
Chatham Maroons (Eastern Canadian Champions)
Vernon Canadians (Western Canadian Champions)

Playdowns

Allan Cup Best-of-Seven Series
Chatham Maroons 7 - Vernon Canadians 1
Vernon Canadians 6 - Chatham Maroons 2
Vernon Canadians 7 - Chatham Maroons 1
Vernon Canadians 6 - Chatham Maroons 4
Vernon Canadians 5 - Chatham Maroons 3

Eastern Playdowns
Semi-final
Chatham Maroons defeated Sudbury Wolves 3-games-to-2 with 2 ties
Chatham Maroons 3 - Sudbury Wolves 1
Chatham Maroons 1 - Sudbury Wolves 1
Sudbury Wolves 4 - Chatham Maroons 1
Chatham Maroons 3 - Sudbury Wolves 3
Chatham Maroons 4 - Sudbury Wolves 2
Sudbury Wolves 3 - Chatham Maroons 1
Chatham Maroons 4 - Sudbury Wolves 1
Final
Chatham Maroons defeated St. John Beavers 4-games-to-1
St. John Beavers 5 - Chatham Maroons 4
Chatham Maroons 6 - St. John Beavers 3
Chatham Maroons 5 - St. John Beavers 3
Chatham Maroons 6 - St. John Beavers 2
Chatham Maroons 5 - St. John Beavers 2

Western Playdowns
Semi-final
Winnipeg Maroons defeated Fort William Beavers 4-games-to-none
Winnipeg Maroons 3 - Fort William Beavers 2
Winnipeg Maroons 11 - Fort William Beavers 2
Winnipeg Maroons 11 - Fort William Beavers 4
Winnipeg Maroons 4 - Fort William Beavers 1
Final
Vernon Canadians defeated Winnipeg Maroons 4-games-to-none with 1 tie
Vernon Canadians 4 - Winnipeg Maroons 1
Vernon Canadians 5 - Winnipeg Maroons 4
Vernon Canadians 2 - Winnipeg Maroons 2
Vernon Canadians 3 - Winnipeg Maroons 1
Vernon Canadians 7 - Winnipeg Maroons 5

External links
Allan Cup archives 
Allan Cup website

Allan Cup
Allan Cup